In molecular biology, glycoside hydrolase family 42 is a family of glycoside hydrolases.

Glycoside hydrolases  are a widespread group of enzymes that hydrolyse the glycosidic bond between two or more carbohydrates, or between a carbohydrate and a non-carbohydrate moiety. A classification system for glycoside hydrolases, based on sequence similarity, has led to the definition of >100 different families. This classification is available on the CAZy web site, and also discussed at CAZypedia, an online encyclopedia of carbohydrate active enzymes.

The glycosyl hydrolase 42 family CAZY GH_42 comprises beta-galactosidase enzymes. These enzyme catalyse the hydrolysis of terminal, non-reducing terminal beta-D-galactoside residues. The middle domain of these three-domain enzymes is involved in trimerisation.

References 

EC 3.2.1
GH family
Protein families